Robert Hope Moncrieff (18461927) was a prolific Scottish author of children's fiction and of Black's Guides.

Early life
Robert Hope Moncrieff was born on 26 February 1846, the lawful son of George Moncrieff (11 May 191716 May 1865), a solicitor and his first wife Angela Birch (19 September 182025 December 1848). The couple had married the previous year in St Brides Church in Liverpool on 2 June 1845. Robert was quickly followed by a brother, John Forbes (5 July 18477 March 1927), and a sister, Angela Mary (27 November 18488 March 1864).
 
Moncrieff's mother, Angela, died of childbed fever four weeks after the birth of Angela Mary. Moncrieff was under three. His father married a second time on 27 June 1854 to Maria Wilks Williamson Rodgers (183030 March 1859) in Kilkenny, Ireland. The family now lived at No 7, Atholl Crescent in Perth. Maria gave George three more children: George Henry (2 November 185523 February 1947); Francis Edward (24 March 18577 January 1884); and Henrietta (14 June 185830 April 1859), who died in infancy.

Moncrieff's step-mother, Maria, died when he was just 13, and his father married again before he was 15. His third wife was Isabella Roy (29 October 182818 January 1879) whom he married on 16 January 1861 in 2, Atholl Crescent. Perth, Scotland. Her father was not a soldier, but the Captain of a ship trading in Asia with the permission of the East India Company.

Moncrieff and his brother were in boarding school by the time their father married for the third time. The 1861 Census shows both Moncrieff (15) and his brother John (13) boarding at the Circus Place School in Edinburgh. This was a highly regarded school which prepared pupils for the Edinburgh Academy. Moncrieff went on to attend the Edinburgh Academy and then the University of Edinburgh.

Moncrieff's father died four in 1865, four years after his third marriage. when Moncrieff was 19. Moncrieff wrote nearly fifty years later that his mother had died before he knew her and that: my father also was taken too soon, leaving me precociously independent. Not one of his father's three marriages lasted five years, all ending prematurely with the death of either wife or husband. Moncrieff himself never married.

Writing
Before he was out of his teens, Moncrieff had written and made money by a real book. While he attended the University of Edinburgh he wrote A book about Dominies (1867), Dominies being a term used for schoolmasters in Scotland. This was taken by a publisher, who published it at his own expense with a promise of profit to the author, which proved rather a mirage in the cold light of publishing accounts. It was published anonymously with no author's name given. The book was well reviewed and went into several editions. Moncrieff followed this up with A Book About Boys, (1868) adopting his pseudonym Ascott R. Hope for the first time. Moncrieff was ashamed of some of his early books and went to some expense to withdraw them from circulation.

Moncrieff says that he had have made awkward attempts at more than one handicraft, with the view of gathering straw for literary bricks. He was said to have taken up teaching briefly more with the purpose of studying schoolboys and their ways than to making it a profession.

Moncrieff travelled extensively. Even his census returns in the UK show how much he bounced around:
 1851Living with his widowed father and two siblings in Perth. 5 years old.
 1861At the Circus Place School in Edinburgh with his brother John.
 1871An assistant master at Christ College, Brecon in Wales.
 1881Boarding at 8, Victoria Grove, in Kensington, London. Profession now is Author.
 1891Boarding at Hillside Boarding Lodge in Ventnor on the Isle of Wight. Profession is Author. The 13th edition of Black's Guide to the Isle of Wight, edited by Moncrieff, was published in 1895. 
 1901Now 55 years old. Moncrieff was no longer boarding, but was at the head of his own establishment at 85 Munster Road in Fulham, London. No relatives in the house, but the house also holds his 60-year-old housekeeper and her adult daughter. The electoral register show that he was still there in 1907.
 1911Only occupant of 5 Chandos Road, Cricklewood, London, apart from a 52-year-old housekeeper.
 1927On his death at 81 years-of-age he was living at 16a Addison Gardens, Kensington, London.

Moncrieff not only travelled the whole of Great Britain, but he also travelled internationally. He wrote: It has been by lot to be a good deal about the world from an early age. After a boyish visit to Paris, my travels began with a cruise in the Mediterranean and a stay in Italy, still heaving from Garibaldi's exploits. Moncrieff travelled, and visited four continents. He even tried his hand at farming in Canada, but soon abandoned it. All of his travels contributed not only to the background for his books, but also supported his books on geography and history. Moncrieff suffered from short-sightedness and this led him to favour occupations such as walking and riding. And these leisurely pursuits allowed him to make observations that he made use of when writing on topographical topics.

His study of the geography of the world, The world of to-day : a survey of the lands and peoples of the globe as seen in travel and commerce (1905) took him five years, and was updated every two years or so. Moncrieff wrote ever word of the six volumes, bar a single page.

Moncrieff was a member of first the Savile and later of the Athenaeum. He was of a kindly nature and always ready to do good to others, but in a discreet way. He wrote that his work seldom brought him into contact with fellow authors, and that still less had he cultivated what is called smart society. His view of the world's affairs was mainly that of a looker-on. He wrote: I have lived my life in my own way, and that his writing was the sum of his accomplishments.

Death
Moncrieff died at Eltham, London, England on 10 August 1927. He was living at 16a Addison Gardens in Kensington, London at the time. He left an estate valued at £11,482 14s 6d. His step-brother George survived him by 20 years.

Short stories and serials
Moncrieff contributed stories to numerous Boy's Papers and Magazines. He has stories in the first issues of the Boy's Own Paper and Union Jack. The following is a very incomplete list, drawn from Steve Holland's British Juvenile Story Papers and Pocket Libraries Index. Some of the stories, like Dick's Dog, later reappeared in books of stories by Moncrieff.

Books other than Black's Guides
In the semi-autobiographical A Book About Authors (1914) Moncrieff wrote that: For more than forty years I have been an author of all work, what the contemptuous call a hack... His range was very broad and included:
School stories for boys
Serial stories in boy's papers
Translations of works in other languages. Moncrieff says he spent his time when travelling learning other languages and translating works in them.
Books about religionincluding martyrdom and religious persecution
Entertaining essaysabout being a teacher, about school boys, etc.
Encyclopedic and instructional worksabout animals, history, or geography, etc.
Black's Guides for tourists

This following section lists the guides that Moncrieff worked on, while this section lists books other than the guides.

Black's Guides
Adam and Charles Black published an extensive series of guides known as Black's Guides, as well as illustrated books describing different localities. Although Moncrieff is usually credited as the editor, the work was more involved than the term editor would suggest. Moncrieff said: I have edited, that is mainly written, or re-written, some dozens of guide-books, most of them appearing in successive editions. The list of those which could be found in searches on the Jisc Library Hub Discover, which aggregates catalogues for academic libraries, and libraries of record in the UK and Ireland. The differences between the editions were not trivial, and sometimes involved a complete rewrite. The more popular books were revised more often than the less popular books, as changes in railways, towns and cities, and in hotels and attractions brought the need for new editions. The table below is not exhaustive as not all of the different editions are held in the libraries.

The guides fall into two broad categories:
Books with a great deal of colour illustration with notes, such as Bonnie Scotland (1904), later republished as Scotland (1922). This had 75 leaves of colour illustrations from paintings by Harold Sutton Palmer. The notes did not so much describe the views painted, but put them in a historical and literary context, together with railway directions.
The Guides proper: Books that serve as tour guides, with maps, and accounts of places of interest, and journeys, be they on foot along the coast, or by rail or road.

Notes

References

External links

Works by Moncrieff at the Internet Archive
Works by Moncrieff online at the Hathi Trust.
Works by Moncrieff online at the British Library.

1846 births
1927 deaths
Alumni of the University of Edinburgh
People educated at Edinburgh Academy
19th-century Scottish writers
19th-century Scottish novelists
Scottish children's writers
Scottish novelists
Scottish short story writers
Scottish historical novelists
Scottish travel writers
Writers from Edinburgh
Victorian novelists
19th-century pseudonymous writers